Hammerhead is a British Eurospy thriller film directed by David Miller and starring Vince Edwards, Judy Geeson, and Diana Dors. Its plot concerns a criminal mastermind who attempts to steal NATO secrets, with an American agent hot on his trail. It is based on the 1964 novel by English novelist James Mayo, and produced by Irving Allen and written by Herbert Baker, who made the Matt Helm films for Columbia Pictures. It was filmed in London and Portugal.

Synopsis
British intelligence asks a soldier of fortune, Charles Hood, to go to Portugal and help stop an international criminal mastermind called Hammerhead, who plans to steal a secret report on nuclear defence.

Hood manages to board the yacht owned by Hammerhead, a collector of valuable erotic art. He is distracted along the way by model Sue Trenton and a pair of Hammerhead's mistresses, Ivory and Kit.

Hammerhead intends to kidnap Britain's NATO delegate, Sir Richard Calvert, and replace him with a lookalike, Andreas, a master of disguise. He finds out Hood's identity and traps  Sue and him inside a coffin, but they manage to escape. Kit and Andreas both are killed, while Ivory does away with Hammerhead personally, using a harpoon.

Cast
 Vince Edwards ...  Charles Hood 
 Judy Geeson ...  Sue Trenton 
 Peter Vaughan ...  Hammerhead 
 Diana Dors ...  Kit 
 Michael Bates ...  Andreas / Sir Richard 
 Beverly Adams ...  Ivory 
 Patrick Cargill ...  Condor 
 Patrick Holt ...  Huntzinger 
 William Mervyn ...  Walter Perrin 
 Douglas Wilmer ...  Pietro Vendriani
 Tracy Reed ...  Miss Hull 
 Kenneth Cope ...  Motorcyclist 
 Kathleen Byron ...  Lady Calvert 
 Jack Woolgar ...  Tookey Tate 
 Joseph Furst ...  Count Ortega 
 Andreas Malandrinos ...  Post Office Guard 
 David Prowse ...  George 
 Earl Younger ...  Brian 
 Romo Gorrara ...  Marcel 
 Maggie Wright ...  Roselle 
 Veronica Carlson ...  Ulla 
 Penny Brahms ...  Frieda 
 Sarah Hardenburg ...  Kiki 
 Otto Diamant ...  Joa 
 Windsor Davies ...  Police Sergeant 
 Arthur Gomez ...  Cafe Proprietor

Production
The film was based on a novel by James Mayo published in 1964.

Film rights were bought by Irving Allen, the producer. Allen had, at one time, been in partnership with Albert Broccoli, who wanted to make movies based on the James Bond books; Allen did not, the partnership ended, and Broccoli had a huge success with the Bond movies. Allen moved into espionage films himself with the Matt Helm series, and he bought the film rights to Hammerhead. In 1967, Allen said: "at this stage I'm only interested in making money. I'm not interested in kudos or getting good reviews - I've had all that. I'm just concerned with getting the greatest number of people into theatres."

In May 1967, Allen said the project was on a slate of seven movies he had with Columbia, others being: Cromwell; The Black Frontier; The Wrecking Crew; Savage Canary; The Pocket Venus and The Ambushers. In June of the same year, Allen announced he had signed David Miller to a three-picture deal, starting with Hammerhead, which he would make in London, the following September, from a script by Jack Brierley and Herbert Baker; Allen wanted it to be the first in a series. After that month, Allen announced he had also signed Vince Edwards to a three-picture contract starting with Hammerhead. Edwards described his part as "like Humphrey Bogart in The Maltese Falcon".

The original plan was to film in France but this was changed to Portugal. That August, Allen announced Judy Geeson would co-star.

The production of the film was delayed because Columbia contract star Vince Edwards suffered a bone-fracture during the filming in Portugal in 1967.

Diana Dors had previously appeared in another spy movie, Danger Route.

Reception
The Los Angeles Times called it "overfamiliar and mechanical, a jaded Bond".

The film was a box office disappointment and there was no sequel. Quentin Tarantino said he was a "big fan" of the movie, but disliked Vince Edwards' performance, even though he generally enjoyed Edwards as an actor. He felt Robert Culp would have been better casting.

References

External links

Hammerhead at TCMDB
Hammerhead at Letterbox DVD
Hammerhead at BFI

1968 films
1960s spy thriller films
British spy thriller films
Films shot at MGM-British Studios
Films directed by David Miller
Columbia Pictures films
Films based on British novels
Films shot in London
Films shot in Portugal
Films with screenplays by John Briley
Parody films based on James Bond films
Films shot at Associated British Studios
1960s English-language films